Denmark women's national under-17 football team represents Denmark in international youth football competitions.

FIFA U-17 Women's World Cup

The team has qualified in 2008

UEFA Women's Under-17 Championship

The team has participated in 2008 and 2012

Previous squads
2008 FIFA U-17 Women's World Cup

Players

Current squad 
The following players were selected for the 2022 UEFA Women's Under-17 Championship in Bosnia-Herzegovina.

Head coach: Claus Struck

See also
Denmark women's national football team

References

External links
 Danish Football Association

under17 
Women's national under-17 association football teams